A mobile data management strategy is a structure imposed on a complex data model that is to be navigated by a user on a mobile device.  This is a relatively new process born from the popularity of mobile applications that requires a flexible and in-depth navigation structure.  There are several methods for such strategy, each describing approaches to a variety of tasks or activities.

Overview 
The general aim is to create a data structure that provides a rich in-depth content with a simple and intuitive navigational paradigm, allowing the user to feel in control rather than feeling controlled by the software.  The structure of the data/navigation should also allow the user to explore an interface without feeling lost, as users instinctively explore applications when using them for the first time.

Moult's Data Strategy 
This approach was first used in the Sky News iPad project (March 2011) and later amended to form the constitution of Sky New's content management system for the expanded Sky News iPhone project (October 2011).
The main goal is to create a data structure that closely matches the applications navigation, ensuring a breadth of content, but forcing the depth of each content item to a maximum of two levels. Therefore, the root of the data is only ever a maximum of two back button taps anywhere in the navigation, adhering to the users exploring behavior while allowing them to keep a mental model of the structure of the content. 
Due to the tight coupling of the data to the navigation structure it allows any issues discovered by users to be investigated and solved quickly by development teams that were not involved in the original development process.

This strategy is enshrined in Moult's Law.

Moult's Law 

1. A Hub is the only data structure that is allowed to point to an Enhanced Module

2. An Enhanced Module can only point to a Basic Module.

Module - a set of data relating to a specific type of content
Enhanced Module - a module that has the possibility to point to another module
Basic Module - a module that contains no links to other modules.

Mobile telecommunications